Marion Buillet (born August 16, 1990 in Saint-Martin-d'Hères) is a French cross-country skier.

Buillet competed at the 2014 Winter Olympics for France. She placed 36th in the qualifying round in the sprint, failing to advance to the knockout stages.

Buillet made her World Cup debut in December 2010. As of April 2014, her best finish is 10th, in a freestyle team sprint race at Milan in 2011–12. Her best individual finish is 11th, in a freestyle sprint race at Szklarska Poreba in 2013–14. Her best World Cup overall finish is 81st, in 2011-12. Her best finish in a discipline is 53rd, in the sprint in 2013-14.

Cross-country skiing results
All results are sourced from the International Ski Federation (FIS).

Olympic Games

World Cup

References

1990 births
Living people
Olympic cross-country skiers of France
Cross-country skiers at the 2014 Winter Olympics
People from Saint-Martin-d'Hères
French female cross-country skiers
Sportspeople from Isère
Universiade bronze medalists for France
Universiade medalists in cross-country skiing
Competitors at the 2015 Winter Universiade
21st-century French women